Statistics of Latvian Higher League in the 1954 season.

Overview
It was contested by 10 teams, and Sarkanais Metalurgs won the championship.

League standings

References
RSSSF

Latvian SSR Higher League
Football 
Latvia